American rapper Baby Tate, formerly known as Yung Baby Tate, has released one studio album, six extended plays (EPs), 25 singles (including eight as a featured artist), four promotional singles, and nine solo music videos.

Albums

Studio albums

Mixtapes

Extended plays

Singles

As lead artist

As featured artist

Promotional singles

Guest appearances

Music videos

Notes

References

Discographies of American artists
Hip hop discographies